11th BSFC Awards
January 6, 1991

Best Film: 
 Goodfellas 
The 11th Boston Society of Film Critics Awards honored the best filmmaking of 1990. The awards were given on 6 January 1991.

Winners
Best Film:
Goodfellas
Best Actor:
Jeremy Irons – Reversal of Fortune
Best Actress:
Anjelica Huston – The Grifters and The Witches
Best Supporting Actor:
Joe Pesci – Goodfellas
Best Supporting Actress:
Jennifer Jason Leigh – Last Exit to Brooklyn and Miami Blues
Best Director:
Martin Scorsese – Goodfellas
Best Screenplay:
Nicholas Kazan – Reversal of Fortune
Best Foreign-Language Film:
Monsieur Hire • France

External links
Past Winners

References
Goodfellas Receives Boston Critics Awards Daily News
1990 Boston Society of Film Critics Awards Internet Movie Database

1990
1990 film awards
1990 awards in the United States
1990 in Boston
January 1991 events in the United States